Finnerödja is a locality situated in Laxå Municipality, Örebro County, Sweden with 604 inhabitants in 2010.

References 

Populated places in Örebro County
Populated places in Laxå Municipality